Mark Russell (born 1932) is an American political satirist and comedian.

Mark Russell may also refer to:

 Mark Russell (actor) (born 1933), Scottish-American film and television actor
 Mark Russell (Australian footballer) (born 1962), Australian footballer for Sydney
 Mark Russell (comics) (born 1971), American comics writer
 Mark Russell (composer) (born 1960), British composer
 Mark Russell (cricketer) (born 1970), English cricketer
 Mark Russell (charity director) (born 1974), Northern Irish evangelist and charity executive
 Mark Russell (footballer, born 1996), Scottish footballer
 Mark Russell (hurler), Irish hurler
 Mark Francis Russell (born 1960), British businessman